The 2004–05 Burkinabé Premier League is the 43rd edition of top flight football in Burkina Faso. A total of fourteen teams competed in the season beginning on 11 December 2004 and ending on 9 July 2005. Rail Club du Kadiogo were champions and Sanmantenga FC finished last and were relegated.

Teams 
Association Sportive des Employés et Commerçants de Koudougou (ASEC-K) - Koudougou
ASFA Yennenga (ASFA-Y) - Ouagadougou
ASF Bobo Dioulasso (ASFB) - Bobo-Dioulasso
US de la Comoé (USCO) - Banfora
Étoile Filante de Ouagadougou (ÉFO) - Ouagadougou
JC Bobo-Dioulasso (JCB) - Bobo-Dioulasso
Rail Club du Kadiogo (RCK)
US Ouagadougou (USO) - Ouagadougou
RC Bobo Dioulasso (RCB) - Bobo-Dioulasso
Sanmatenga FC - Kaya
Santos FC - Ouagadougou
AS SONABEL - Ouagadougou
Union Sportive des Forces Armées (USFA) - Ouagadougou
Union Sportive du Foyer de la Régie Abidjan-Niger (US FRAN) - Bobo-Dioulasso

League table

References 

Premier League
Premier League
Burkina Faso
Burkinabé Premier League seasons